The Vermilion River is a tributary of the Wabash River in the states of Illinois and Indiana, United States.

There are two "Vermilion Rivers" in Illinois. The Wabash tributary flows south, while the other Vermilion River flows north to the Illinois River. There are also two Little Vermilion rivers, one flowing into the Wabash River and one into the Illinois.

The north-flowing Vermilion River and the south-flowing Middle Fork Vermilion River lie along a straight line connecting Oglesby and Danville. The two rivers drain what was once an upland marsh near Roberts. The two rivers have been extended by drainage ditches so that they nearly connect at their headwaters. The rivers may share a common name because early settlers regarded them as a single river that flowed two directions. The rivers may have served as a canoe route between the Illinois River and Wabash River, with a portage through the marshes near Roberts.

Tributaries
The main tributaries of the Vermilion River join near Danville:
Salt Fork Vermilion River
Middle Fork Vermilion River
North Fork Vermilion River

The Salt Fork is the western tributary. It arises north of Urbana, flowing east toward Danville. It was named for the saline springs in its lower reaches. When settlers first arrived in the area, the saline springs were the basis of the dominant industry.

The Middle Fork arises near Roberts, and flows southeast toward Danville. The Middle Fork is notable as the only river in Illinois designated as a National Wild and Scenic River by United States National Park Service. This scenic stream flows through Kickapoo State Park near Danville and is a favorite of Illinois canoeists.

The North Fork arises in Indiana to the northeast of Hoopeston, Illinois. It flows south and southwest toward Danville.

From Danville, the Vermilion River flows to its confluence with the Wabash River to the east of the Illinois/Indiana border.

Cities and counties
The following cities, towns and villages are among those in the Vermilion River watershed:                
Champaign, Illinois
Danville, Illinois
Homer, Illinois
Hoopeston, Illinois
Paxton, Illinois
Rantoul, Illinois
St. Joseph, Illinois
Sidney, Illinois
Urbana, Illinois
potomac, illinois
Portions of the following counties are drained by the Vermilion River:
Benton County, Indiana
Champaign County, Illinois
Ford County, Illinois
Iroquois County, Illinois
Vermilion County, Illinois
Vermillion County, Indiana
Warren County, Indiana

See also
List of Illinois rivers
List of Indiana rivers
Watersheds of Illinois

References

Illinois Atlas & Gazetteer, DeLorme, 1996

External links
Prairie Rivers Network
USGS Stream Gage, Vermilion River

Rivers of Illinois
Rivers of Indiana
Tributaries of the Wabash River
Rivers of Champaign County, Illinois
Rivers of Ford County, Illinois
Rivers of Iroquois County, Illinois
Rivers of Vermilion County, Illinois
Rivers of Vermillion County, Indiana
Rivers of Warren County, Indiana